Nick Carter, le roi des détectives (1908) is a French silent serial film based on the popular American novels featuring master detective Nick Carter. It was written by Georges Hatot and directed by Victorin-Hippolyte Jasset for the Éclair company. It was released in six episodes, each of which told a complete story, but their release was timed at approximately fortnightly intervals to create a sense of continuity with the audience. The stories were set in Paris.

Episodes
The episodes, their release dates, and length were as follows:

Part 1. Le Guet-Apens  (The Doctor's Rescue).  8 September 1908. 185 metres.
Part 2. L'Affaire des bijoux  (The Jewel Affair).  22 September 1908. 218 metres.
Part 3. Les Faux Monnayeurs  (False Coiners).  6 October 1908.  187 metres.
Part 4. Les Dévaliseurs de banque (The Bank Burglar).  20 October 1908.  150 metres.
Part 5. Les Empreintes  (The Imprints).  27 October 1908.
Part 6. Les Bandits en noir  (The Bandits in Evening Dress). 15 November 1908.  235 metres.

The success of the film led the company to make further Nick Carter adaptations in the following years, and there were also imitations made by other companies.

References

Further reading
 Richard Abel. The Ciné Goes to Town: French Cinema 1896-1914. (Berkeley CA: University of California Press, 1998) pp. 195–198.

External links 

1908 films
French black-and-white films
Film serials
French detective films
French silent films
Nick Carter (literary character)
French mystery films
1900s French films